The 1953 Liège–Bastogne–Liège was the 39th edition of the Liège–Bastogne–Liège cycle race and was held on 3 May 1953. The race started and finished in Liège. The race was won by Alois De Hertog.

General classification

References

1953
1953 in Belgian sport
1953 Challenge Desgrange-Colombo